Junee National Park is a national park in Queensland, Australia, 30 km east of Middlemount.

See also

 Protected areas of Queensland

References 

National parks of Central Queensland
Protected areas established in 2000
2000 establishments in Australia